Charles Martin Reagan (12 May 1924 – 26 December 2016) was an English professional footballer and coach / manager. During his playing career, Reagan played in the Football League for York City, Hull City, Middlesbrough, Shrewsbury Town, Portsmouth and Norwich City. He later coached the England women's national football team. Prior to his football career Reagan served as a Staff Sgt Tank Commander in World War II.

Playing career
From 1947-48 Reagan made 18 appearances for Hull, where he attracted the attention of Middlesbrough, in 1948 paid £5,000 to sign Reagan from Hull City. Over the next three years he scored four goals in 25 league and cup appearances, and is credited with scoring Middlesbrough's 1000th league goal, before joining Shrewsbury Town. On New Year's Eve 1952 Portsmouth bought Reagan from Shrewsbury for £12,000 and played him in their next five matches. Reagan did not play for Portsmouth again but remained with the club until August 1954 when he joined Norwich City. After two years with Norwich, Reagan became player manager at March Town United in the Eastern Counties Football League.

Coaching career
After managing March, Reagan became manager at Goole Town. He later became head coach of the England women's national football team from 1979 until 1990, and was in charge for 96 matches during his 11-year tenure. Reagan took England to the final of the 1984 European Competition for Women's Football, where they lost a two-legged tie to Sweden after a penalty shoot out at Kenilworth Road in Luton. Despite also winning the Mundialito (known as the little World Cup) twice in 1985 and 1988, the Women's Football Association (WFA) sacked Reagan in 1990 when a 6–1 UEFA Women's Euro 1991 quarter final aggregate defeat by Germany cost England a place at the inaugural FIFA Women's World Cup.

At the 1985 Mundialito Reagan had noticed the potential of the United States women's national soccer team, when England beat them 3–1 in their third ever match. He wrote a prescient letter to his American counterpart Mike Ryan which said "The day cannot be very distant when you will be a world force." From 1989–2003 Reagan was director of coaching at the Two Rivers Soccer Camp in California, USA.

Personal life

As well as his football career Reagan worked as a self–employed sales agent. Prior to his death in December 2016, Reagan was the oldest surviving Middlesbrough FC player and lived in a Kirk Hammerton care home. Before his football career, Reagan served as a Staff Sgt Tank Commander in 204 Armoured Assault Squadron, Royal Engineers, during World War II. On 20 October 1994, the 50th anniversary of an explosion which killed many of his tank squadron, Reagan visited Ijzendijke in the Netherlands with his three sons and began a campaign to fund and build a memorial to those who had died. The memorial, at the entry to Isabellaweg Farm, is the site of an annual commemoration of the British and Canadian soldiers who died there.

References

Bibliography

External links
 

1924 births
2016 deaths
English footballers
Association football midfielders
York Railway Institute A.F.C. players
York City F.C. players
Hull City A.F.C. players
Middlesbrough F.C. players
Shrewsbury Town F.C. players
Portsmouth F.C. players
Norwich City F.C. players
English Football League players
English football managers
England women's national football team managers
March Town United F.C. players
March Town United F.C. managers
Goole Town F.C. managers
York City F.C. wartime guest players
British Army personnel of World War II
Footballers from Newcastle upon Tyne
Royal Engineers soldiers
Tank commanders